Euphaedra mbamou is a species of butterfly in the family Nymphalidae. It is endemic to the Republic of the Congo and the Democratic Republic of the Congo (Bas-Zaire).

Similar species
Other members of the Euphaedra zaddachii species group q.v.

References

Butterflies described in 1987
mbamou